Hoeflea anabaenae is a bacterium from the genus of Hoeflea.

References

External links
Type strain of Hoeflea anabaenae at BacDive -  the Bacterial Diversity Metadatabase

Rhizobiaceae
Bacteria described in 2011